The New Minster in Winchester was a royal Benedictine abbey founded in 901 in Winchester in the English county of Hampshire.

Alfred the Great had intended to build the monastery, but only got around to buying the land. His son, Edward the Elder, finished the project according to Alfred's wishes, with the help of Saint Grimbald who became its first abbot. It stood so close to the Old Minster that the voices of the two choirs merged with chaotic results. The body of King Alfred was transferred to the New Minster, Saint Grimbald joined him and it was also given the body of the Breton Saint Judoc (Saint Josse), making it an important pilgrimage centre. It became a Benedictine house in 963. 

According to John of Worcester, in 972 King Edgar "ordered the church of the New Minster, begun by his father King Edmund, but completed by himself, to be solemnly dedicated". It is not known what parts of the church were rebuilt. Queen Emma added the head of Saint Valentine in 1041. With the building of the new cathedral at Winchester after the Norman Conquest of England, the monks of New Minster were obliged to move to Hyde Mead just outside the northern city walls, thus founding the Abbey of Hyde.

Burials
Alfred the Great
Ealhswith
Saint Grimbald
Edward the Elder
Ælfweard of Wessex
Eadwig

References

External links
Victoria County History of Hampshire: New Minster, or the Abbey of Hyde

Anglo-Saxon monastic houses
Anglo-Saxon sites in England
Archaeological sites in Hampshire
Abbeys in Hampshire
Benedictine monasteries in England
Buildings and structures in Winchester
Christian monasteries established in the 10th century
10th-century establishments in England
1538 disestablishments in England
Religious buildings and structures completed in 901
Churches in Winchester